Spiceland Township is one of thirteen townships in Henry County, Indiana, United States. As of the 2010 census, its population was 2,279 and it contained 991 housing units.

Spiceland Township was organized in 1842. It was named from the growth of spice bushes within its borders.

Geography

Cities and towns
 Dunreith
 Spiceland

Unincorporated towns
 Ogden
 Stone Quarry Mills
(This list is based on USGS data and may include former settlements.)

Adjacent townships
 Henry Township (northeast)
 Franklin Township (east)
 Center Township, Rush County (south)
 Wayne Township (west)
 Greensboro Township (northwest)

Major highways
  Interstate 70
  U.S. Route 40
  State Road 3

Education
Spiceland Township residents are served by the Spiceland Town-Township Public Library.

References
 U.S. Board on Geographic Names (GNIS)
 United States Census Bureau cartographic boundary files

External links
 Indiana Township Association
 United Township Association of Indiana

Townships in Henry County, Indiana
Townships in Indiana